The Service de Renseignement de l'État, full name Service de Renseignement de l'État Luxembourgeois (SREL; Luxembourgish: Lëtzebuerger Staatlëchen Noriichtendéngscht), is Luxembourg's homeland intelligence agency. The agency is colloquially known in Luxembourgish as the "Spëtzeldéngscht“ ("Spy Service").

Purpose
The SRE was set up to collect and evaluate data, to deal with threats to Luxembourg, its allies or international organisations based in the country, particularly in regard to critical infrastructure, especially energy and water infrastructure, road infrastructure, and information technology.

The service was restructured in 2004, under pressure from the “war on terror”, created after the terror attacks on 11 September 2001. The restructuring resulted in the legal basis for the creation of an intelligence agency (Loi du 15 juin 2004 portant organisation du Service de Renseignement de l’Etat) to deal with the following threats:

Preparation and execution of terrorist attacks
Espionage
Interference of foreign states in national affairs
Proliferation of weapons of mass destruction
Organized crime, provided it is in relation to the threats mentioned above
Carrying out security checks on persons that come into contact with confidential information by profession (e.g. Government officials, public administration)
Worldwide surveillance, and decryption of electronic communications

Leadership
Patrick Heck has been the executive director of the SRE since March 1, 2010, and his predecessor Marco Mille held the position from 2003 to 2009.

Bombers affair
As part of the legal proceedings regarding a series of unsolved bombings which took place during the mid-1980s, commonly referred to as the Bombers Affair, over the years the dubious practices of the SRE were exposed.

In July 2013 the final report of the commission of enquiry, which was appointed six months beforehand, was published. The report placed the political responsibility of the uncontrolled activities of the SRE upon prime minister Jean-Claude Juncker. Juncker had also fallen victim to the practices of the SRE, as in 2007 the then intelligence chief Marco Mille secretly recorded a conversation between himself and Juncker. 

Juncker announced new elections on 10 July 2013, following the scandal surrounding the activities of the SRE.

See also 
 Frank Schneider

References

External links 
 Adresses of the 'Service de Renseignement' (French)
 Sûreté Extérieure et Service de Renseignement – The legal requirements (French, PDF, 91 kB)
 „Nur noch kurz die Welt retten“, Frankfurter Allgemeine Zeitung article (German)

Government agencies of Luxembourg
Government agencies established in 1960
Domestic intelligence agencies